Yury Revich (born 28 August 1991) is an Austrian classical violinist and composer. He was named the Young Artist of the Year in 2015 by the International Classical Music Awards (ICMA) and the 2016 ECHO Klassik "Newcomer of the year (violin)" award. He plays on a Stradivari 1709 violin on loan from the Goh Family Foundation.

Life and career

Born in Moscow, Revich studied with Galina Turchaninovoy from 2005 to 2009, with Victor Pikaizen, and since 2009 with Pavel Vernikov at the Konservatorium Wien. Amongst his awards are the first prize at the International Violin Competition "Virtuosi of the 21st Century" in Moscow and the National Prize of the Patriarch of All Russia Alexy II "Christmas Star". He participated in the International Charity Fund of Vladimir Spivakov. In May 2009, he made his debut at New York's Carnegie Hall.

He has performed at international Festivals, such as the Verbier Festival, Vladimir Spivakov's Festival in Colmar (France), the Rostropovich Festival in Baku (Azerbaijan), the Rome Chamber Music Festival, Liana Isakadze's Festival in Batumi (Georgia), the Festival of music in Kaunas (Lithuania), and the Eilat Festival in Israel.

Revich has received several awards at international competitions for young musicians - in particular, the first prize at the International Violin Competition "Virtuosi of the 21st Century" in Moscow and the National Prize of the Patriarch of All Russia Alexy II "Christmas Star", According to TV Tsentr, French master luthier Alain Carbonare presented Revich with a Carbonare violin. He won the first prize of the Guzik Foundation. The journalist Natalia Kolesova wrote in 2001:

In his performance of Basque Capriccio by Sarasate you heard drama, passion and courageous rigor. Gloss playing a young violinist once again proved that in the world of music maturity comes not with age, and responds to the depth of feelings.

He first played at Zurich Tonhalle and La Scala in Milan (Italy) in 2013, performing Tchaikovsky's Violin Concerto with the Orchestra Sinfonica di Milano Giuseppe Verdi conducted by Zhang Xion.
He records for Sony Classical, ARS, Odradek and onepoint.fm.

In 2015 Revich launched a new international concert cycle in Vienna "Friday Nights with Yury Revich". In June of that year he organized the First Gala Concert in Vienna "All for Autism" to support the Austrian Center for Autism (Österreichische Autistenhilfe). He is an honorary representative for UNICEF Austria.

Recordings
 Russian Soul – with Valentina Babor (piano), 2012, Ars Produktion 1008420
 Andreas Romberg: 3 Violin Sonatas, Op.32 – 2013, Sony Classical Switzerland G010002935153N
 Romberg: Concertos 2013, Sony Classical Switzerland 
 Mozart and Sarasate 2014, OnePoint.FM
 8 Seasons 2015, Ars Produktion 38170
 Steps through the Centuries 2015, Odradek Records 0855317003103

References

External links
 Official web-site
 Dreamland with Yury Revich humanitarian project

1991 births
Russian classical violinists
Male classical violinists
Living people
21st-century classical violinists
21st-century Russian male musicians